Abergel, also spelled Abargil, Abergil, Abourgil, Abourgal, Abourjal, Abirjal, Aberjel) is a Moroccan Jewish surname. It is very common among the Moroccan Jews and may be found also among Algerian and Tunisian Jews of Moroccan descent. The name comes from Moroccan Arabic word "Bourjila" which means the "One-footed".

Notable people with the surname include:

 Avital Abergel (born 1977), Israeli actress
 Dena Abergel, New York City Ballet assistant children's balletmaster
 Laurent Abergel (born 1993), French footballer
 Linor Abargil (born 1980), Israeli beauty pageant winner
 Nir Abergel (born 1990), Israeli footballer
 Rebecca Abergel, French chemist
 Reuven Abergel (born 1943), Israeli activist
 Thal Abergel (born 1982), French chess Grandmaster
 Yaniv Abargil (born 1977), Israeli footballer

See also 
 Abargil

References 

Arab-Jewish surnames
Maghrebi Jewish surnames
Arabic-language surnames
Sephardic surnames
Surnames of Moroccan origin